Robin Cho, better known as Choice37, is a Korean-American record producer, songwriter, and DJ based in South Korea. He joined YG Entertainment as a producer in 2009, and has since produced songs for K-pop artists including Big Bang, Blackpink, G-Dragon, Ikon, and Lee Hi.

Biography

Choice37 was born and raised in Los Angeles, California, where he was a member of the hip hop group Longevity Crew. The group released one album, Everything Builds, in 2005. Choice37 also released one solo album, Diligence. In 2008 he moved to South Korea where he was introduced to YG Entertainment CEO Yang Hyun-suk by childhood friend and record producer Teddy Park. Choice37 soon began working for YG, and his song, "Butterfly," performed by G-Dragon, was released in 2009.

Awards

References

External links
 

American hip hop record producers
American male composers
21st-century American composers
South Korean composers
South Korean hip hop record producers
South Korean record producers
YG Entertainment artists
Musicians from Los Angeles
Living people
Record producers from California
21st-century American male musicians
Year of birth missing (living people)